Hyderabadi marag or marag is a spicy mutton soup served as a starter in Hyderabad, India and part of Hyderabadi cuisine. It is prepared from tender mutton with bone. It is thin soup. The soup has become one of the starters at Hyderabadi weddings.

Ingredients
The ingredients include those locally available such as mutton with bone, onions, cashew nuts, curd, coconut powder, boiled milk, cream, ginger-garlic paste, salt, cardamom, cinnamon,  cloves, black pepper powder, green chillies, etc.

See also
 List of Indian soups and stews
 List of soups

References

External links
 RECIPE 
 Marag Recipe  

Hyderabadi cuisine
Telangana cuisine